Helmut Zemo is a fictional character appearing in American comic books published by Marvel Comics, most commonly as an adversary of the superhero Captain America and the Avengers. He is the son of Baron Heinrich Zemo and the thirteenth Baron Zemo in his family lineage. The character first appeared in Captain America #168 (Dec. 1973) and was created by Roy Thomas, Tony Isabella and Sal Buscema.

Daniel Brühl portrays the character in the Marvel Cinematic Universe, appearing in the film Captain America: Civil War (2016) and the Disney+ series The Falcon and the Winter Soldier (2021). In 2009, Helmut Zemo was ranked as IGN's 40th Greatest Comic Book Villain of All Time.

Fictional character biography
In the comics, Helmut Zemo (aka the 13th Baron Zemo) is Heinrich Zemo's son, born in Leipzig, Germany. Helmut was originally an engineer until he became enraged when reading a report about the return of Captain America and his father's death. Helmut would ultimately follow in his father's footsteps, using his family's money and his own scientific know-how to recreate his father's work.

Helmut first surfaced under the alias of the Phoenix, and captured Captain America to get revenge upon him for the death of his father. He was presumed deceased when he fell into a vat of boiling, specially-treated Adhesive X (a chemical created by his father Heinrich, which was a universal adhesive and was practically indissolvable). In a battle with Captain America, spilt Adhesive X permanently attached Heinrich's hood to his face, preventing him from ever removing it; in a dramatic echo, Helmut's face was hideously scarred by the boiling Adhesive X, giving his face the appearance of molten wax.

He resurfaced years later in the comics as Baron Zemo, first allied with Arnim Zola's mutates. He allied with Primus I and the half-rat/half human mutate Vermin, and kidnapped Captain America's childhood friend Arnold Roth in order to lure Captain America into a trap. He forced the Captain to battle hordes of mutates before revealing that he knew Captain America's secret identity.

Zemo later encountered Mother Superior and the Red Skull. Zemo underwent tutelage by Mother Superior and Red Skull, and then kidnapped Captain America's friend David Cox and brainwashed him to battle Captain America. Zemo then kidnapped Roth again, and directed a shared mental reenactment of Heinrich Zemo's last World War II encounter with Captain America. Zemo then battled Mother Superior, but was psychically overpowered.

Most notably, he formed a new incarnation of the Masters of Evil. This fourth Masters of Evil was formed to strike at Captain America through the Avengers; they invaded and occupied Avengers Mansion and crippled Hercules and the Avengers' butler Edwin Jarvis. Zemo captured Captain America and the Black Knight. Zemo battled Captain America, but fell off the mansion roof.

Zemo later hired Batroc's Brigade and psychic detective Tristram Micawber to help him locate the five fragments of the Bloodstone in hopes of restoring his father to life. Fighting Captain America and Diamondback, Zemo's plan backfired, as he instead turned his father's corpse into a vessel for the demonic forces that lurk inside of the Bloodstone. The reanimated corpse was destroyed by Crossbones (who sought to steal the Bloodstone for Red Skull) and a distraught Zemo fell down an inactive volcano in Japan trying to retrieve it.

Zemo survived the fall, though his right hand (which was not protected by a glove) was horrifically burnt and mangled. Driven insane by the destruction of his father's body, Helmut took control of an army of mutates and tried to re-enslave Vermin. He was defeated by Spider-Man and Vermin was freed.

Broken and beaten, Zemo was taken in by a female scientist calling herself "the Baroness", who modeled herself after Heinrich. The two married and began kidnapping abused, neglected children to serve as their children. Zemo's sanity returned and he even created a new realistic face mask to hide his disfigured face from his adopted children, whom he nurtured and swore to protect from those who might return them to their abusive foster homes. The couple's peaceful life was ultimately shattered when Captain America discovered their home, while searching for the evil super-scientist Superia. Superia and the Baroness (who revealed that she had pretended to be Heinrich Zemo reborn in a clone body during a fight with Silver Sable and Spider-Man) mocked Helmut and his newfound domestic househusband status as they plotted to kill him. Zemo turned on his wife and Superia, before turning his attention to dropping Captain America into a vat of Adhesive X. The plan failed and Zemo (now wearing his trademark hood) fell into the container instead, with the Baroness (hoping to curry favor with her husband), falling in after him. The two were rescued by Captain America and Helmut bemoaned that like his father, his face now was permanently hidden by his mask. Captain America responded by revealing that the Avengers had since found a way to dissolve Adhesive X and would use it to free Zemo from his costume and hood, a fact that drove him further into a rage due to Captain America never offering to share this adhesive remover with his father.

Zemo ultimately escaped prison, though his wife the Baroness died shortly after being sentenced to prison for her role in the abduction of the children they were raising. During this time, Zemo discovered that Goliath was imprisoned in the Microverse and formed a new version of Masters of Evil to free Goliath. But after rescuing Goliath, the Avengers and the Fantastic Four disappeared during the Onslaught crisis and were presumed dead. After overhearing the Beetle (Abe Jenkins) and Goliath talk about who would replace the Avengers and The Fantastic Four, a distraught Zemo soon found a new purpose for his team: the Masters of Evil would take on new heroic identities as the Thunderbolts. Zemo would lead the group under the alias Citizen V (a twist of irony as Heinrich Zemo had killed the original Citizen V during World War II) and planned to have the Thunderbolts gain the world's trust in order to conquer it. The public took a liking to the team much more quickly than Zemo, or any of the other Thunderbolts, expected and soon most of them came to like the feeling of being heroes.

When the missing heroes returned, Zemo had the Thunderbolts' true identities leaked, forcing them to flee with him into deep space to assist his plan to conquer the world through mind control. However, most of the Thunderbolts rebelled and with the assistance of Iron Man foiled Zemo's plan. Zemo went into hiding and plotted revenge on his former teammates (who were trying to win back the public's trust by being true heroes). After another of Zemo's plans was foiled by Captain America and a new Citizen V (Dallas Riordan), Helmut was killed by the new Scourge of the Underworld, though his mind was transferred via bio-modem technology into the comatose body of John Watkins III. Now in possession of Watkins' body, Zemo again played the Citizen V role, this time as a member of the V-Battalion, until the Thunderbolts' final battle with Graviton, during which his consciousness was removed from Watkins' body and transferred, in electronic form, into his ally Fixer's mechanical "tech-pack". 

On the artificial world Counter-Earth - the same world to which the Avengers and The Fantastic Four had previously vanished - the Thunderbolts encountered Zemo's counterpart, Iron Cross, in that world. Fixer transferred Zemo's mind into his double's unmutilated body.  Zemo then took up leadership of the Thunderbolts who were on Counter-Earth; when this group was reunited with their teammates who had remained on the normal Marvel Universe Earth,  Hawkeye briefly resumed leadership, but then left the team to return to the Avengers.

For a while Zemo remained the leader of the Thunderbolts. In 2004's "Avengers/Thunderbolts" limited series, he attempted to take over the world again — this time with the belief that he could save the world by taking it over. Zemo now seems to be motivated by a twisted altruism rather than his original selfish desires; he feels he has grown beyond his father in that regard.  However, the Avengers foiled his scheme, his teammate Moonstone went berserk, Zemo's new body was blasted while he attempted to protect Captain America, and he left the team and went into hiding after obtaining Moonstone's twin alien gems, two artifacts of great power. 

Zemo had been manipulating the United States government, the New Thunderbolts, the Purple Man, the Squadron Sinister, and a host of other relatively obscure Marvel characters.  His goals are unknown, but he is clearly still motivated by a desire to save the world by taking it over, or at least manipulating it towards what he perceives as a beneficial future. Zemo has also, apparently through trial and error, learned how to use the power of the moonstones in various ways, from simply generating raw energy, to transporting himself and others through time, space, and dimensions, to viewing possible future events through dimensional rifts—and, apparently, to repair his damaged face (or, at least to create the illusion that it was undamaged). He has also recruited members of both his original and subsequent incarnations of the Thunderbolts to his cause, as well as eventually bringing the current team of Thunderbolts around to joining him.  The group resides in what Zemo calls his "Folding Castle", a structure that he has connected to various other places around the world by dimensional portals.

As a result of The Civil War storyline, Iron Man asked Zemo to begin recruiting villains to his cause, which Zemo had already been doing, unknown to Iron Man. However, he met up with Captain America and informed him that he really had reformed. He showed Captain America his face, once again scarred, to remind him of his earlier sacrifice, and gave him a key that would allow him to escape from the super-human prison being constructed if Captain America would allow his Thunderbolts to fight the Squadron Sinister. He also gave Captain America all his old mementos, destroyed by Zemo in 'Avengers Under Siege', which he had gone back in time and rescued with the help of the Moonstones. Finally, Captain America agreed.

Zemo was always told as a child that he was superior, he now believes his father's Nazi ideals to be untrue, and that the only way to become superior is through righteousness. After helping Captain America, he remarked to his father's portrait that the man would be displeased with today's good deeds. Zemo—once again wearing his unscarred face—then revealed that Songbird was going to betray him and he was going to sacrifice himself in their upcoming battle with the Squadron Sinister. He told her that he would not die, but that he would become superior through his sacrifice "by living forever".

Zemo revealed his true nature when he saved the Wellspring of Power from the Grandmaster planning to use it for his own ends. Believing that all of his visions were subject to the flow of time, and that nothing was set in stone, Zemo defeated the Grandmaster, and boasted to his teammates that the power was now all his—and theirs. He insisted that he would use it to help the world, despite the consequences of doing so. Songbird, having temporarily lost her own powers during the final battle, was told by Zemo "...now is when your betrayal would have come". However, the vision of Songbird's betrayal turned out to be true after all. Using a simple opera note to crack the moonstones, Songbird sent Zemo into a whirlwind of cosmic space/time. Just before he was completely sucked into the vacuum, he screamed out that he "would never have hurt a world he worked so hard to save".

The limited series Thunderbolts Presents: Zemo - Born Better (2007), written by Fabian Nicieza and drawn by Tom Grummett, explores the history of the Zemo barony. Helmut, sucked into the vacuum, wakes up in medieval Germany (1503), witnessing Harbin Zemo's death and his succession, while in the present academic Wendell Volker and Reed Richards deduce that Helmut has traveled in time. Captured and taken prisoner as a leper, Helmut manages to inspire Harbin's twelve-year-old grandson Heller Zemo to kill his own father Hademar Zemo and fulfill his destiny as the third (and most enlightened and progressive) Baron Zemo. Heller goes to the hidden cell to free his "muse", discovering that Helmut has somehow disappeared. Helmut makes a jump to 1556 where he fights alongside Heller's son Herbert Zemo, then later jumps to 1640 where he slays Herbert's son Helmuth Zemo, and later arrives in 1710 where he narrowly escapes being killed by Helmuth's son Hackett Zemo.

Meanwhile, in the present, Volker reveals that the Zemo bloodline is not just limited to Helmut's immediate family. In fact, Harbin's descendants are spread out all over the world. Wendell visits Miss Klein, a descendant of a bastard child of Hilliard Zemo, the eighth Baron Zemo and Jewish lover Elsbeth Kleinenshvitz. Hilliard becomes baron after the death of his father Hartwig Zemo in the Seven Years' War. In the past Helmut sees Hilliard and Elsbeth in love, realizing that the residual energy of the Moonstone is drawing him into the present, but forcing him to stop and live every key moment of Zemo's lineage. Helmut manages to save Elsbeth, who is sentenced to die by the Diet because of her Jewish ancestry and her wealthy family, but in the present Volker kills her distant descendant, convinced that his actions can pull Helmut to his proper place in the time stream. 

Helmut next ends up in 1879 where he stays for several weeks working his way up to be part of the travelling guard of Hobart Zemo, the tenth Baron Zemo. Hobart is killed during a civilian uprising shortly after German Emperor William passes legislation to curb the Socialist party. Helmut jumps forward in time before he can save his own great-grandfather. Helmut arrives during World War I in a battle between British forces led by the original Union Jack and German forces led by his own grandfather Baron Herman Zemo, the eleventh Baron Zemo. Helmut witnesses Herman's men slaughter the majority of the British forces with mustard gas. Later, Helmut goes with Herman and his men to find Castle Zemo reduced to rubble by the war. Helmut travels forward in time again to his father's tenure as a Nazi during World War II. 

Back in the present, Volker discovers that Castle Zemo has been restored in the present. Wendell tours the castle with a local German police man and Interpol agent Herr Fleischtung, Wendell murders both men. Wendell has apparently murdered several Zemo relations in the belief that this spilling of Zemo blood would bring Helmut back to the present.

After battling his own father in the past, giving him the inspiration to take up the Zemo mantle, Helmut returns to the present and manages to convince Wendell not to kill him as well, instead taking what is discovered to be his cousin under his wing, as he sets out to do something new for the world. 

Following the events of The Siege crossover as seen in the Heroic Age storyline, Luke Cage assumes control over the Thunderbolts and has Fixer impersonate Zemo as a test to see which of his new teammates would betray the team if offered a chance to escape.<ref>Thunderbolts #144-145</ref> Later on, it was revealed that Fixer was keeping in secret contact with Zemo while working on the Raft. During the Fear Itself event, Zemo gave Fixer key info on the mutant army threatening Chicago.

Having spent his time on the sidelines, watching Norman Osborn's rise to power with the intent of waiting to see what Norman would do with control over the Thunderbolts and later S.H.I.E.L.D., Zemo reappeared following the events of the Siege when Osborn was ultimately defeated by The Avengers. A chance encounter at the Thunderbolts' former base in Colorado with the Ghost led to him learning Bucky Barnes was the current iteration of Captain America. Zemo confronted his rival and discovered how the man had survived his father's death trap only to become the Winter Soldier, a trained Soviet assassin who killed scores of people for several Russian handlers. But most alarming was the fact that Zemo discovered the original Captain America had not only forgiven his successor for the crimes, but had actively covered them up even after Winter Soldier blew up a huge chunk of New York, killing several dozen S.H.I.E.L.D. agents in order to restore power to a Cosmic Cube fragment.

Zemo recruited Jurgen "Iron-Handed" Hauptmann (of Red Skull's Exiles), as well as Fixer and a new female version of Beetle to expose the current Captain America's sins to the world. This included drugging Bucky with nanites that caused Captain America to behave irrationally and attack police officers and leaking to the media, not only detailed files revealing Winter Soldier's acts of terrorism committed as a mind-controlled pawn of the Russians, but video footage as well of him being trained by handlers. Zemo ultimately kidnapped Bucky and took his father's victim to Heinrich's island which is where Bucky's original "death" occurred. There Zemo confessed that he did what he did, not out of a desire to finish the job his father started, but out of jealousy over how Captain America and his allies quickly forgave Bucky for his crimes, yet continue to scorn the reformed Helmut who had saved the world on numerous occasions. Zemo then forced Bucky into a similar deathtrap as the one his father put Bucky in, modified though in order to allow Bucky a chance to escape. Zemo then escaped from the island unharmed.

Zemo has since turned his eye towards Hawkeye, who he blames for usurping control over the Thunderbolts from him. Zemo makes a deal with Hawkeye's former mentor Trick Shot (whose cancer had returned) to train Zemo's mystery acquaintance to become a master archer in exchange for medical care. When the training was complete, Zemo reneged on the deal. Trick Shot (on the brink of death) was delivered to Avengers Tower to serve as a message to Hawkeye. Before he died in his former pupil's arms, Trick Shot warns Hawkeye of the threat he will soon face.

In the pages of Avengers Undercover, Zemo has become the new leader of The Shadow Council's Masters of Evil following the death of Max Fury.

Zemo later becomes the new leader of HYDRA and enters into conflict with Sam Wilson, the new Captain America. Using the toxic blood of an Inhuman boy named Lucas, Zemo plans to sterilize the human race and distribute a cure to only a small portion of those infected, thus forcibly solving the planet's problems with overpopulation and lack of resources. He later kills Ian Rogers, the new Nomad and Captain America's partner, by slashing his throat and sends a photo to Steve Rogers. He later fights Wilson to a standstill until Lucas escapes via jet plane to spread his blood in the world.

During the Avengers: Standoff! storyline, Zemo appears as a prisoner of the S.H.I.E.L.D. established gated community called Pleasant Hill where the technology Kobik that was derived from the Cosmic Cube turned him into an amnesiac man named Jim who later discovered that Pleasant Hill is surrounded by a forcefield. He briefly witnessed an eerie girl bring a bird back to life until she is taken away by some adults. Then he encounters a mechanic named Phil who arranges a meet-up following his arson activity. On Day 40, Jim met Phil who had created a device that enabled people to return to their true selves. Phil also stole a training video where Mayor Maria Hill gave a video tour of Pleasant Hill describing to the S.H.I.E.L.D. cadets watching this to be the future of supervillain incarceration where they are turned into mild-mannered civilians using reality-warping technology derived from the Cosmic Cube called "Kobik". A demonstration was shown when Graviton was turned into a Pleasant Hill inhabitant named Howie Howardson. As Phil uses the device on himself and Jim to restore their true selves, Jim was restored back to Zemo while Phil was Fixer once again. Both of them vow to use the device on the other brainwashed supervillain prisoners and reduce Pleasant Hill to dust. Zemo and Fixer started working on restoring the memories of the inmates one by one. Then Zemo led a coordinated assault on a S.H.I.E.L.D. outpost that serves as the Pleasant Hill City Hall. After Kraven the Hunter captures Kobik, he loads her into Fixer's machine where Baron Zemo plans to control Kobik. During the Avengers' fight with Baron Zemo's villain allies, both Zemo and Erik Selvig tried to get Kobik to come with them. Kobik ended up teleporting Zemo and Selvig away from Pleasant Hill. They were last seen in the Himalayas trying to make their way back to civilization. Zemo brings Selvig with him as he's crucial to his next plan.

After leaving the Himalayas, Zemo begins to form his "New Masters" group, he starts by recruiting Firebrand, Flying Tiger, and Plantman II. They later encounter Steve Rogers, the original Captain America, Free Spirit and Jack Flag. Zemo then tries to escape with Doctor Selvig until Captain America enters his plane. Before he could kill Steve Rogers, Zemo is defeated by Jack Flag. After Rogers pushes Jack Flag out of the plane, he makes the plane crash into a building to kill Doctor Selvig and Zemo. However, it is later revealed that Rogers kept Zemo in a cell. Rogers then manages to convince Zemo that they were best friends since childhood, since Rogers's reality was rewritten by Kobik to believe he has been a Hydra double agent since childhood, and recruits him in his mission to kill the Red Skull. Zemo then starts to recruit all the supervillains who escaped from Pleasant Hill.

After Rogers kills the Red Skull's clone in his mansion during the "Opening Salvo" part of the "Secret Empire" storyline, Zemo arrives with his larger team of supervillains that he formed on Rogers' behalf called the Army of Evil. After the Army of Evil disappears after attacking Manhattan, Helmut Zemo uses the Darkhold to enhanced a brainwashed Blackout into covering Manhattan in a Darkforce dome while trapping the heroes there. During the Underground's battle with HYDRA in Washington DC, Zemo goes to awaken the Army of Evil from their stasis as Winter Soldier arrives in time to free Black Panther. Both of them apprehend Zemo before he can awaken the Army of Evil.

Helmut Zemo leads HYDRA into occupying Bagalia. In his shared plot with Dario Agger and Roxxon Energy Corporation to have the United Nations recognize Bagalia as an independent nation, Helmut Zemo selects Mandarin as the public face for Bagalia where Mandarin uses the alias of Tem Borjigen. As part of his revenge on HYDRA for manipulating him, Punisher finds Mandarin making a speech at the United Nations and fires a special bullet. After using his rings to slow down the bullet while trying to deflect it, Mandarin is struck in the head with the bullet which is witnessed by Baron Zemo and anyone watching his speech.

Powers and abilities
Helmut Zemo is a gifted genius with certain scientific knowledge, excellent marksmanship, and impressive training in unarmed combat. He is also a highly accomplished leader and strategist. His headband has built-in circuitry designed to disrupt psychic powers. He carries various rifles and sometimes, a handheld spray gun for Adhesive X, the most powerful bonding agent ever invented. Like his father, Helmut does not grow old. The Moonstones grant him a wide array of abilities, including gravity, light, or molecular manipulation, superhuman strength and durability, as well as flight.

Reception
 In 2018, Comicbook.com included Baron Zemo in their "7 Great Villains for Black Panther 2" list.
 In 2020, CBR.com ranked Helmut Zemo 8th in their "Marvel: Ranking Black Panther's Rogues Gallery" list.
 In 2021, Screen Rant included Helmut Zemo in their "10 Best Marvel Legacy Villains Who Lived Up To Their Predecessor" list.
 In 2022, Screen Rant included Baron Zemo in their "15 Most Powerful Black Panther Villains" list.

Other versions
Marvel Zombies
In the Marvel Zombies limited series, a zombified Baron Helmut Zemo and his Thunderbolts attack Thor before he receives aid from Nova.

MC2
Helmut Zemo appears in the MC2 universe in an alternate reality in which Red Skull and the Nazis had successfully conquered the Earth. This version is a scientific advisor to Red Skull's successor, Victor Von Doom and Reed Richards. After Doom's demise at the hands of Crimson Curse, Richards and Zemo fight to become his successor.

Ultimate Marvel
In the Ultimate Marvel universe, Loki disguises himself as Baron Zemo while leading Third Reich soldiers and Ice Giants in an attack on Asgard during World War II.Ultimate Thor #2. Marvel Comics. In the present, Loki's elderly second-in-command Helmutt Zemo uses the Norn Stones to summon the god of mischief to his time. After escaping The Room With No Doors, Loki murders Zemo.

Marvel MAX
In Deadpool MAX, a heavily altered version of Baron Helmut Zemo appears in the first storyline. This version of the character is an American white supremacist who claims to have descended from German nobility despite having come from a working-class home. He fosters a hatred of minorities due to his father having had an affair with a black woman as well as the irrational belief that Jewish doctors killed his mother with poisoned water. He finds a survivalist retreat dubbed "Whiteland" and plans to use sarin gas on his followers to incite a race war across the United States. However, his plans are foiled when Deadpool infiltrates the compound and accuses Zemo of possessing Jewish ancestry, which distracts Zemo's henchmen long enough for Deadpool to kill them and Zemo.

Old Man Logan
In the Old Man Logan universe, Helmut Zemo is responsible for the deaths of most of the Avengers after turning the Thunderbolts against them. He only leaves Hawkeye alive out of spite for taking the Thunderbolts from him to begin with. Decades later, Hawkeye goes on a revenge killing spree against all the Thunderbolts for their betrayal. When he confronts Zemo in the Weapon X facility, he finds the villain in a wheelchair as Zemo had developed ALS while also working on recreating the Super Soldier Serum. While Hawkeye initially planned to leave Zemo humiliated in his condition, he instead decides to shoot dozens of arrows into Zemo using the last of his sight.

In other media
Television
 Baron Helmut Zemo appeared in The Avengers: United They Stand episode "Command Decision", voiced by Phillip Shepherd.
 Baron Helmut Zemo and his Citizen V identity appear in Avengers Assemble, voiced by David Kaye. This version is the son of Heinrich Zemo, and a high-ranking operative of Hydra. Introduced in the episode "Saving Captain Rogers", he manipulates Captain America into helping him retrieve his father Heinrich Zemo's super-soldier serums as his own formula was imperfect. Helmut successfully uses one to rejuvenate himself with superhuman strength and speed, but is defeated by Captain America, Iron Man, and Black Widow, and disappears into the ocean while trying to retrieve the second one. After resurfacing in the episode "Under Siege" with the Masters of Evil, they return in the episodes "The Thunderbolts" and "Thunderbolts Revealed" as the eponymous superhero team, with Zemo disguised as Citizen V. While fighting various supervillains alongside the Avengers, Zemo initiates an elaborate scheme to kill them. After his allies begin to embrace being the Thunderbolts, Zemo seemingly kills them and the Avengers before issuing a public statement as Citizen V claiming they had perished, only for the two teams to return and expose his true identity. In the episode "The Zemo Sanction", Black Panther initially suspects Helmut of working with the Shadow Council and confronts him. However, Helmut reveals he intends to destroy the Council in the hopes of saving his legacy and joins forces with Black Panther to do so. Over the course of the next several episodes, he gains the Wakandan royals' trust and proves his integrity to Captain America while secretly working to seize the Wakandan crown and three Wakandan relics before the Council does. In the episode "Descent of the Shadow", Zemo betrays the Avengers and takes the crown, not realizing it is fatal to anyone who wears it outside of Wakanda and without Vibranium. After the crown is removed, Madame Masque and Erik Killmonger condemn him for his betrayal by throwing him off a bridge and leaving him to drown.

 Marvel Cinematic Universe 

Daniel Brühl portrays a heavily modified version of Helmut Zemo in live-action media set in the Marvel Cinematic Universe. This version is a Baron of Sokovia and former special operations soldier who seeks revenge against the Avengers for the death of his family at the hands of Ultron, who was created by Tony Stark and Bruce Banner.

 Zemo first appears in the film Captain America: Civil War (2016). In pursuit of his goal to fracture the Avengers and potentially get them to kill each other, he tracks down retired Hydra agents and frames Bucky Barnes for a bombing at the United Nations that killed King T'Chaka of Wakanda. After Steve Rogers and Sam Wilson bring in Barnes, Zemo disguises himself as the psychiatrist sent to evaluate Barnes while his accomplices cause a power outage, during which Zemo uses Hydra information he obtained to reactivate Barnes' brainwashing and set him on the Avengers. In the confrontation, Zemo hints to Rogers that he wants to "see an empire fall", which leads Rogers, Wilson and Barnes to believe Zemo intends to awaken five sleeping Winter Soldiers at a Siberian Hydra base and use them to take over the world. Once Zemo, Rogers, Barnes, and Stark reach the base however, they learn Zemo killed the Winter Soldiers and shows them an old security tape that reveals Barnes was responsible for murdering Stark's parents years ago, which Rogers kept from Stark. As the Avengers fight each other, Zemo retreats and attempts suicide, believing his mission is complete. However, T'Chaka's son T'Challa, who sought to avenge his father's death, stops Zemo and takes him to the authorities.
 Zemo subsequently appears in the miniseries The Falcon and the Winter Soldier (2021). In the episode "Power Broker", Barnes breaks Zemo out of prison to help him and Wilson stop the Flag Smashers. Over the course of the episodes "The Whole World Is Watching" and "Truth", Zemo destroys several vials of recreated Super Soldier Serum and kills their creator, Dr. Wilfred Nagel, before the Dora Milaje eventually capture and send him to the Raft. In the series finale "One World, One People", following the Flag Smashers' defeat and capture, Zemo arranges their murder to minimize the chance of their Super Soldier enhancements being reproduced.

Video games
 Baron Helmut Zemo appears as a boss in the PlayStation, PC, Game Boy, and Sega Game Gear versions of Iron Man and X-O Manowar in Heavy Metal.
 Baron Helmut Zemo appears as a boss in Marvel: Avengers Alliance.
 Baron Helmut Zemo appears as a playable character in Marvel Avengers Academy.
 Baron Helmut Zemo and his Citizen V alias appear as separate downloadable playable characters in Lego Marvel's Avengers, both voiced by Robin Atkin Downes. They appear via the "Masters of Evil" and "Thunderbolts" DLC packs respectively.
 Baron Helmut Zemo appears as a playable character in Lego Marvel Super Heroes 2.
 Baron Helmut Zemo appears as a subscription-exclusive playable character in Marvel: Future Fight, as part of the Secret Empire update.
 Baron Helmut Zemo appears as a playable character in Marvel Strike Force''.

Toys
There have been two different Baron (Helmut) Zemo action figures in Hasbro's Marvel Legends line. The more recent of the two was a Walgreens exclusive of Zemo in his most iconic costume. The other figure dates back several years, and represents Zemo in one of his more recent outfits.

References

External links
 Helmut Zemo at Marvel.com
 Helmut Zemo at Marvel Database
 Baron Helmut Zemo at Comic Vine
 

Action film villains
Captain America characters
Characters created by Jack Kirby
Characters created by Sal Buscema
Comics characters introduced in 1973
Fictional barons and baronesses
Fictional characters from Saxony
Fictional characters with slowed ageing
Marvel Comics film characters
Marvel Comics male supervillains
Marvel Comics neo-Nazis
Villains in animated television series